Tomasz Jasiński (born 1951) is a Polish historian, dean of the History Department at the Adam Mickiewicz University in Poznań. He specializes in medieval history of Poland.

Son of Kazimierz Jasiński, a Polish historian and medievalist.

Publications 
 Pierwsze lokacje miast nad Wisłą. 750 lat Torunia i Chełmna, Toruń 1980.
 Przedmieścia średniowiecznego Torunia i Chełmna, Poznań 1982.
 Przerwany hejnał, Kraków 1988.
 Kodeks dyplomatyczny Wielkopolski, t. VIII-XI: documents from years 1416-1444 (t. VIII-X with Antoni Gąsiorowski, t. XI with Antoni Gąsiorowski, Tomasz Jurek and Izabela Skierska), Warszawa - Poznań 1989 - 1999.
 Tabliczki woskowe w kancelariach miast Pomorza Nadwiślańskiego, Poznań 1991.
 Najstarsze kroniki i roczniki krzyżackie dotyczące Prus, Poznań 1996.
 Βδέλυγμα της έρημώσεως. Über die Anfänge des Neuen Testaments, Poznań 1998.
 O pochodzeniu Galla Anonima, Kraków 2008.
 Kruschwitz, Rimini und die Grundlagen des preußischen Ordenslandes. Urkundenstudien zur Frühzeit des Deutschen Ordens im Ostseeraum, Marburg 2008.
 Kronika Polska Galla Anonima w świetle unikatowej analizy komputerowej nowej generacji, Poznań 2011.
 The Slavs’ Ancestral Homeland, Poznań 2021.

References
 Biografical note

20th-century Polish historians
Polish male non-fiction writers
Polish medievalists
1951 births
Living people
21st-century Polish historians
Academic staff of Adam Mickiewicz University in Poznań